Hyssia degenerans is a species of cutworm or dart moth in the family Noctuidae. It is found in Central America and North America.

The MONA or Hodges number for Hyssia degenerans is 10597.1.

References

Further reading

 
 
 

Eriopygini
Articles created by Qbugbot
Moths described in 1914